A girdle is a garment that encircles the midsection.

Girdle may also refer to:
 Girdle (chiton), part of the anatomy of the marine mollusks known as chitons
 The Girdle, a mountain range in California
 Girdle of Thomas, a belt dropped by the Virgin Mary to the Apostle Thomas  
 Cincture, a liturgical vestment
 Girdle book, small medieval European books able to be hung from the belt
 Girdle pain, pain that encircles the body like a belt
 Girdle Toll, a small village on the outskirts of Irvine, North Ayrshire
 Pelvic girdle, an anatomical term
 Pectoral girdle, an anatomical term
 Girdle (gemstone), element of round gemstone cuts
 Girdle moths, moths in the genus Enypia
 Girdle (undergarment), form-fitting foundation garment often worn to shape or for support

See also
 Gartel
 Girdling, the removal of a ring of tree bark
 Griddle, a cooking pan or plate, known in Scotland as a girdle